Scott County Jail may refer to:

Scott County Jail (Iowa) in Davenport
Scott County Jail Complex in Georgetown, Kentucky